Kincaid Field was an athletic field in the located on the campus of the University of Oregon in Eugene, Oregon.  acquired the property and used it for athletics from c. 1895 until 1922; it was succeeded by Hayward Field for football in 1919.

Kincaid was located on the west side of campus, on what is now the Memorial Quadrangle.

References

Sports venues in Eugene, Oregon
Defunct college football venues
Oregon Ducks football venues
1900s establishments in Oregon
1922 disestablishments in Oregon